Anis Freiha was a Lebanese author who has written extensively about Lebanese traditional village life.

Life
He was born in the town of Ras el Matn, Mount Lebanon,
and studied at the American University of Beirut AUB, and at the University of Chicago, where he earned a PhD.
He is considered an authority on Lebanese traditional village life and his books contain many descriptions of the origin of village names, traditions and stories, and rich in architectural and detailed description of village artifacts and objects. His novels have inspired various narratives and plays on Lebanon's village culture.

Books
Isma'a Ya Rida
The Lebanese Village, a Culture Being Forgotten 
Before I Forget 
Names of Lebanese Villages and their Origins
New Dictionary of Lebanese Proverbs

References

Lebanese novelists
Year of birth missing
Year of death missing